Rosenbaum is a surname of German origin, which translates as "rose tree" and which was given to people living in the proximity of rose bushes. The surname is common among Ashkenazi Jews, but is also associated with various non-Jews of German origin. Notable people with the surname include:

Al Rosenbaum, American artist and cofounder of the Virginia Holocaust Museum
Alexander Rosenbaum, Russian-Jewish bard from Saint Petersburg
Alexis Rosenbaum, French essayist
AnNa R., Andrea Neuenhofen, née Rosenbaum, German singer and songwriter
Ayn Rand, born Alisa Zinov’yevna Rosenbaum, Russian-American writer and philosopher, founder of Objectivism
Benjamin Rosenbaum, American science fiction writer
Berta Rosenbaum Golahny, American painter
Victor Borge, born Børge Rosenbaum, Danish comedian
Bezalel Ronsburg, German rabbi also known as Daniel Rosenbaum
Daniel Rosenbaum, American-Israeli basketball player
Danny Rosenbaum, American baseball pitcher
David Rosenbaum (journalist), American journalist
David Rosenbaum (soccer), American soccer player
Diane Rosenbaum, Oregon politician
Edna Phillips, later Edna Phillips Rosenbaum, American harpist
Edward Rosenbaum, American physician and author
Eli Rosenbaum, director of the U.S. DOJ Office of Special Investigations
Enrico Rosenbaum, American songwriter
Fred Rosenbaum, American author, historian
Greg Rosenbaum, American merchant banker
Helmut Rosenbaum, World War II German naval officer
Isamar Rosenbaum, Hasidic rebbe
Jacques Rosenbaum, Estonian architect
James Rosenbaum, American sociology professor
James M. Rosenbaum, American lawyer and judge
James T. Rosenbaum American physician-scientist
Joel Rosenbaum, American professor of cell biology
John Rosenbaum, California artist
Jonathan Rosenbaum, American film critic
Jonathan Rosenbaum (scholar), American paleographer and college administrator
Joseph Rosenbaum, fatally shot in the Kenosha unrest shooting in 2020
Joseph Carl Rosenbaum, Austrian administrator
Richard E. Hughes, born Leo Rosenbaum, American comic book author and editor
Louise Rosskam, born Louise Rosenbaum, American photographer
Marc Rosenbaum, American engineer
Meyer Rosenbaum (I), Grand Rabbi of Kretchnif
Meyer Rosenbaum (II), Chief Rabbi of Cuba
Michael Rosenbaum, American actor
Morris D. Rosenbaum, Utah businessman and early Jewish convert to The Church of Jesus Christ of Latter-day Saints
Paul Rand, born Peretz Rosenbaum, American graphic designer
Paul R. Rosenbaum, American statistician
Polly Rosenbaum, American politician
R. Robert Rosenbaum, television director for Bewitched
Robin S. Rosenbaum, American judge
Ron Rosenbaum, American journalist and author
Rosamund Bernier (née Rosamond Margaret Rosenbaum), lecturer and founder of the art magazine L'ŒILL'ŒIL
Scott Rosenbaum, American screenwriter, producer and showrunner
Simon Rosenbaum (statistician), British academic
Simon Rosenbaum (baseball), American-Israeli baseball player
Simon Rosenbaum (minister), Jewish activist
Stephen Rosenbaum, American visual effects supervisor
Steven Rosenbaum, American television producer
Thane Rosenbaum, American novelist
Therese Rosenbaum (1774–1837), Austrian opera singer
Thomas Felix Rosenbaum, American physicist and president of the California Institute of Technology
Tibor Rosenbaum, Hungarian-born Swiss rabbi and businessman 
Victor Rosenbaum, American pianist, conductor, and music educator
Werner Rosenbaum, German hockey player
Wilhelm Rosenbaum, German SS officer
William Rosenbaum, American politician
Yankel Rosenbaum, Australian Hasidic Jew murdered in the 1991 Crown Heights riot
Zipora Rubin-Rosenbaum, Israeli paralympic athlete

Fictional characters
 Mayor Rosenbaum, a character from Mona the Vampire

See also
Rosenbaum House, a house built by Frank Lloyd Wright
Rosenbaum Brothers Department Store, former American department store
Willem Rooseboom, governor general of the Dutch East Indies

References

Jewish surnames
German-language surnames
Yiddish-language surnames
Surnames from ornamental names